Father Gerard Edward Weston   (20 October 1933 – 22 February 1972) was a British Roman Catholic priest and military chaplain.

Educated at St Mary's College, Crosby and at Upholland, where he was ordained by Archbishop Heenan in 1960. He joined the British Army in 1966 as an army chaplain, serving in Germany, the Persian Gulf, Kenya and Northern Ireland. He attained the rank of captain.

During the height of the Troubles, he frequently entered alone the dangerous areas of Ballymurphy and Turf Lodge in Belfast, talking with local people in an attempt to reduce tension. He was in great personal danger, especially after a rumour circulated that a British soldier was operating disguised as a priest.

He was awarded the MBE for gallantry on 15 February 1972.

Seven days later, Father Weston drew up in his Morris Traveller car at the car-park of the Officers' Mess of the 16th Parachute Brigade in Aldershot. As he was exiting his vehicle, a huge bomb exploded, killing the military chaplain instantly, together with six civilians. He was 38 years old.

The Official IRA claimed responsibility, claiming retaliation for Bloody Sunday three weeks earlier.
Public revulsion at the attack was in part responsible for the organisation ordering a ceasefire three months later, and it later disbanded.

Father Weston is buried at SS Peter and Paul Churchyard, Crosby, Merseyside.

References

External links
Catholic Herald, 25 February 1972

1933 births
1972 deaths
People from Crosby, Merseyside
People killed by the Official Irish Republican Army
20th-century English Roman Catholic priests
Royal Army Chaplains' Department officers
Members of the Order of the British Empire
Deaths by car bomb in England
British military personnel killed in The Troubles (Northern Ireland)
Clergy from Liverpool
People educated at St Mary's College, Crosby
People murdered in England
Mass murder victims